Saturday Live is a Saturday morning show that was broadcast on Sky News between 10 a.m. and midday, between 2005 and 2011.  It is presented by Colin Brazier.

It is a two-hour magazine programme covering sport, news, entertainment, and politics,

2005 British television series debuts
2011 British television series endings
Sky News
Sky UK original programming
Sky television news shows